Betta antoni is a species of gourami endemic to the Sanggau area in the Kapuas region. The species name antoni is named after Irwan Anton "in recognition of his generous help and gift of specimens".  This species grows to a length of  SL. According to Linke, they live in "densely vegetated, narrow watercourses with very soft, very acidic water"

References

antoni
Fish described in 2006